Preußisch Oldendorf is a town in the Minden-Lübbecke district, in North Rhine-Westphalia, Germany. In 1905 the town name Oldendorf was changed officially by putting "Preußisch" in front of it, to make the distinction from other towns with the same name more easy (especially for mail and train stations).

Geography
Preußisch Oldendorf is situated on the north side of the Wiehengebirge, approx. 9 km west of Lübbecke, 24 km north-west of Herford and 30 km east of Osnabrück.

Extent and land usage of the borough 
The town's borough has an area of 66.78 km2. Its maximum north–south extent is about 11 km, its maximum east–west extent around 10 km. The highest point in the district is the Altes Verbrenn (291.1 m) in the southeast of the borough. The lowest point (45.8 m) lies in the northwest of the borough in the valley of the Großer Dieckfluss. Its entire northern boundary does not exceed 50 m at any point.

The territory of the borough is predominantly used for arable land and is correspondingly rural. In general, only the Wiehen Hills and the Egge ridge are wooded. Hollwinkel Wood is the only smaller woodland on the plain. Because the Wiehen and Egge constitute a relatively wide section of the Wiehen Hills here, woods occupy a relatively high proportion of the land - just under 20% - in comparison with neighbouring districts. The following table gives an overview of land usage:

Source: LDS

Neighbouring places
 Stemwede
 Espelkamp
 Lübbecke
 Hüllhorst
 Rödinghausen
 Melle
 Bad Essen

Division of the town
Preußisch Oldendorf consists of 10 districts:

Notable residents
 Karl-Friedrich Höcker (1911–2000), German Nazi SS concentration camp officer and war criminal

References

External links

 Official site 

 
Minden-Lübbecke